A Divine Council is an assembly of deities over which a higher-level god presides.

Historical setting
The concept of a divine assembly (or council) is attested in the archaic Sumerian, Akkadian, Old Babylonian, Ancient Egyptian, Babylonian, Canaanite, Israelite, Celtic, Ancient Greek and Ancient Roman and Nordic pantheons. Ancient Egyptian literature reveals the existence of a "synod of the gods". Some of our most complete descriptions of the activities of the divine assembly are found in the literature from Mesopotamia. Their assembly of the gods, headed by the high god Anu, would meet to address various concerns. The term used in Sumerian to describe this concept was Ukkin, and in later Akkadian and Aramaic was puhru.

Examples

Archaic Sumerian
One of the first records of a divine council appears in the Lament for Ur, where the pantheon of Annunaki is led by An with Ninhursag and Enlil also appearing as prominent members.

Akkadian
The divine council is led by Anu, Enlil, and Ninlil.

Old Babylonian
In the Old Babylonian pantheon, Samas (or Shamash) and Adad chair the meetings of the divine council.

Ancient Egyptian
The leader of the Ancient Egyptian pantheon is considered to either be Thoth or Ra, who were known to hold meetings at Heliopolis (On).

Babylonian
Marduk appears in the Babylonian Enûma Eliš as presiding over a divine council, deciding fates and dispensing divine justice.

Canaanite 
Texts from Ugarit give a detailed description of the Divine Council's structure of which El and Ba'al are presiding gods.

Hebrew/Israelite 

In the Hebrew Bible, there are multiple descriptions of Yahweh presiding over a great assembly of Heavenly Hosts. Some interpret these assemblies as examples of a Divine Council:

The Psalm 82 states "God (אֱלֹהִ֔ים Elohim) stands in the divine assembly (בַּעֲדַת-אֵל ‘ăḏaṯ-’êl); He judges among the gods (אֱלֹהִ֔ים elohim)" (אֱלֹהִים נִצָּב בַּעֲדַת־אֵל בְּקֶרֶב אֱלֹהִים יִשְׁפֹּט). The meaning of the two occurrences of "elohim" has been debated by scholars, with some suggesting both words refer to Yahweh, while others propose that the God of Israel rules over a divine assembly of other gods or angels. Some translations of this passage render "God (elohim) stands in the congregation of the mighty to judge the heart as God (elohim)" (the Hebrew is "beqerev elohim", "in the midst of gods", and the word "qerev" if it were in the plural would mean "internal organs"). Later in this Psalm, the word "gods" is used (in the KJV): Psalm 82:6 – "I have said, Ye [are] gods; and all of you [are] children of the most High." Instead of "gods", another version has "godlike beings", but here again, the word is elohim/elohiym (Strong's H430). This passage is quoted in the New Testament in John 10:34.

In the Books of Kings, the prophet Micaiah has a vision of Yahweh seated among "the whole host of heaven" standing on his right and on his left. He asks who will go entice Ahab and a spirit volunteers. This has been interpreted as an example of a divine council.

The first two chapters of the Book of Job describe the "Sons of God" assembling in the presence of Yahweh. Like "multitudes of heaven", the term "Sons of God" defies certain interpretation. This assembly has been interpreted by some as another example of divine council. Others translate "Sons of God" as "angels", and thus argue this is not a divine council because angels are God's creation and not deities.

"The role of the divine assembly as a conceptual part of the background of Hebrew prophecy is clearly displayed in two descriptions of prophetic involvement in the heavenly council.  In 1 Kings 22:19–23... Micaiah is allowed to see God (elohim) in action in the heavenly decision regarding the fate of Ahab. Isaiah 6 depicts a situation in which the prophet himself takes on the role of the messenger of the assembly and the message of the prophet is thus commissioned by Yahweh.  The depiction here illustrates this important aspect of the conceptual background of prophetic authority."

Chinese
In Chinese theology, the deities under the Jade Emperor were sometimes referred to as the celestial bureaucracy because they were portrayed as organized like an earthly government.

Celtic
In Celtic mythology, most of the deities are considered to be members of the same family – the Tuatha Dé Danann. Family members include the Goddesses Danu, Brigid, Airmid, The Morrígan, and others. Gods in the family include Ogma, the Dagda, Lugh and Goibniu, again, among many others. The Celts honoured many tribal and tutelary deities, along with spirits of nature and ancestral spirits. Sometimes a deity was seen as the ancestor of a clan and family line. Leadership of the family changed over time and depending on the situation. The Celtic deities do not fit most Classical ideas of a "Divine Council" or pantheon.

Ancient Greek
Zeus and Hera preside over the divine council in Greek mythology. The council assists Odysseus in Homer's Odyssey.

Ancient Roman
Jupiter presides over the Roman pantheon who prescribe punishment on Lycaon in Ovid's Metamorphoses, as well as punishing Argos and Thebes in Thebaid by Statius.

Norse
There are mentions in Gautreks saga and in the euhemerized work of Saxo Grammaticus of the Norse gods meeting in council. The gods sitting in council in their judgment seats or "thrones of fate" is one of the refrains in the Eddic poem "Völuspá"; a "thing" of the gods is also mentioned in "Baldrs draumar", "Þrymskviða" and the skaldic "Haustlöng", in those poems always in the context of some calamity. Snorri Sturluson, in his Prose Edda, referred to a daily council of the gods at Urð's well, citing a verse from "Grímnismál" about Thor being forced through rivers to reach it. However, although the word regin usually refers to the gods, in some occurrences of reginþing it may be simply an intensifier meaning "great", as it is in modern Icelandic, rather than indicating a meeting of the divine council.

See also
 Pantheon (religion)
 Sons of God
 War in Heaven

References

External links
 Translation of the Lament, from the Electronic Text Corpus of Sumerian Literature
 Michael S. Heiser's Divine Council Website

Pantheism
Hebrew Bible topics
Mythology